Reginald Denham (10 January 1894 – 4 February 1983) was an English writer, theatre and film director, actor and film producer.

Biography
Reginald H. F. Denham was born in London, England, in 1894.

He spent a good part of his career directing Broadway theatre, with a career spanning from the melodrama Rope's End (1929) by Patrick Hamilton, to the courtroom drama Hostile Witness (1966). In 1930 he produced the First World War drama Suspense in the West End.

He was married to Irish actress Moyna Macgill (1919–1924), English actress Lilian Oldland, and American actress and writer Mary Orr (from 1947 until his death). While they were married, Denham and Orr were writing partners.  His daughter with Macgill, Isolde Denham, married  actor Peter Ustinov when they were both 19.

He died following a stroke in Englewood, New Jersey.

Credits

Writer
Paradies der alten Damen (1971) (TV) (criminal play)
The Mad Room (1969) (earlier screenplay) (play Ladies in Retirement)
Lux Video Theatre (2 episodes, 1954–1957)
Dark Hammock (1957) TV episode (play, with Mary Orr)
Ladies in Retirement (1954) TV episode (play, with Mary Orr)
Alfred Hitchcock Presents (1 episode, 1956)
Help Wanted (1956) TV episode (adaptation, with Mary Orr)
The Motorola Television Hour (1 episode, 1954)
A Dash of Bitters (1954) TV episode (teleplay, with Mary Orr)
Broadway Television Theatre (1 episode, 1952)
Suspect (1952) TV episode (play, with Mary Orr)
Mr. & Mrs. North (1952) TV series (unknown episodes)
Suspense (4 episodes, 1949–1950)
The Suicide Club (1950) TV episode
Help Wanted (1949) TV episode (with Mary Orr)
Murder Through the Looking Glass (1949) TV episode (teleplay)
Dead Ernest (1949) TV episode
Wallflower (1944) (play, with Mary Orr)
Ladies in Retirement (1941) (play) (screenplay)
Suspect (1939) (TV)
Trunk Crime (1939) (play)
Calling the Tune (1936)
Ebb Tide (1932)
Hombre que asesinó, El (1931) (adaptation)
Stamboul (1931)

Director
Blind Folly (1940)
Flying Fifty-Five (1939)
Kate Plus Ten (1938)
a.k.a. Queen of Crime (USA)
a.k.a. The Vanishing Train (USA: TV title)
Dreams Come True (1936)
The House of the Spaniard (1936)
Calling the Tune (1936)
 The Crimson Circle (1936)
Lucky Days (1935)
The Silent Passenger (1935)
The Village Squire (1935)
The Price of Wisdom (1935)
Lieut. Daring R.N. (1935)
a.k.a. Lieutenant Daring R.N.
Borrow a Million (1934)
Death at Broadcasting House (1934)
a.k.a. Death at a Broadcast (USA)
a.k.a. Death of a Broadcast
The Primrose Path (1934)
Brides to Be (1934)
Lucky Loser (1934)
Called Back (1933)
The Jewel (1933)

Producer
The Primrose Path (1934)
Brides to Be (1934)

Actor
Nothing Else Matters as Flash Harry (1920)

References

External links

 

1894 births
1983 deaths
20th-century English male actors
20th-century English screenwriters
English male silent film actors
English film directors
English film producers
English male screenwriters
Male actors from London
20th-century English male writers
20th-century English businesspeople
British emigrants to the United States